

The Hobart Building is an office high rise located at 582–592 Market Street, near Montgomery and 2nd Streets, in the financial district of San Francisco, California. It was completed in 1914. It was designed by Willis Polk.

The building was constructed for the Hobart Estate Company on the site of the company's previous offices. The location was reportedly chosen by founder Walter S. Hobart in the 1880s for its prominent location at the head of 2nd Street, originally one of the city's major streets leading to the fashionable Rincon Hill neighborhood. Said to be the favorite commercial building of its designer, Willis Polk, its sculpted terra cotta exterior with Baroque ornamentation and handcrafted brass and Italian marble interior are a noted example of neoclassical architecture.

Its unusual shape was dictated by the site, which is an asymmetric polygon, and since a neighboring structure was torn down in 1967, exposing one flank, it is now even more idiosyncratic and striking. The Hobart Building was designated as a landmark by the City of San Francisco in 1983, and was listed on the National Register of Historic Places in 2021.

See also

 List of tallest buildings in San Francisco
 List of San Francisco Designated Landmarks

Gallery

References

External links

 Fisher Hill Properties: Hobart Building

Skyscraper office buildings in San Francisco
Financial District, San Francisco
Market Street (San Francisco)
Office buildings completed in 1914
1910s architecture in the United States
San Francisco Designated Landmarks
National Register of Historic Places in San Francisco